Rocky and Bullwinkle is a downloadable video game created by Zen Studios for the Xbox Live Arcade. The game is based on The Rocky and Bullwinkle Show. It was released in 2008, making it the franchise's first game in sixteen years.

Reception 
In IGN's 3/10 review they stated "Zen Studios didn't spend much time or money on Rocky & Bullwinkle"

References

External links
 Official website
 Zen Studios

2008 video games
Microsoft games
Xbox 360 Live Arcade games
Xbox 360-only games
Puzzle video games
The Adventures of Rocky and Bullwinkle and Friends video games
Video games developed in Hungary
Xbox 360 games
Zen Studios games
Multiplayer and single-player video games